The Man from Mars is a "first contact" science fiction novel by Stanisław Lem: American scientists are trying to deal with a creature in a crashed spaceship from Mars.

Publication history
It was Stanislaw Lem's first science fiction work, serialized in a Katowice weekly,  ("New Adventure World") in 1946, starting in the first issue. Lem considered it extremely naive and weak; he said he wrote it exclusively "for bread", and refused to reprint it for a long time.  Some Polish science fiction fanclubs produced small editions of pirated reprints. Later it was printed legally several times in Germany, where a publishing house had rights for Stanislaw Lem's juvenilia. The first legal Polish reprint, in book format, was published in 1994 by Independent Publishing House NOWA.

In 2009 for the first time a long excerpt from Chapter 1 was translated into English by Peter Swirski and published with permission of Stanislaw Lem's family in the online literary magazine Words Without Borders.

Plot summary
An American reporter is accidentally forced to join a secret team of scientists who got hold of a crashed spaceship from Mars with a creature they dubbed "areanthrop" (Greek: Ares=Mars + anthropos=man) in it. The areanthrop seems to be a kind of cyborg: a sentient protoplasm which in the course of natural evolution built itself a "robotic suit", rather than developing a biological body. Scientists poke, prod and pry it with all means possible in attempts to study it. Eventually the areanthrop gives them a telepathic trip to Mars and seizes control over a member of the team, and after that it is completely destroyed.

Literary criticism
Despite Lem's own critical attitude,   notes that The Man from Mars is a smoothly written, readable novel that keeps the reader in suspense and does not abuse the technical jargon, although it is written following standard literary recipes, unlike later Lem's works, which break conventions and are full of intellectual challenges.

At the same time the novel sketches a number of ideas further elaborated by Lem in other works, most notably the concept of the inherent impossibility of communication between human and non-human intelligences, best known from his novel Solaris.

References

1946 novels
Novels by Stanisław Lem
Novels set on Mars
Novels first published in serial form
Works originally published in Polish magazines
1946 science fiction novels